Gorni Lom is a village in north-western Bulgaria, Vidin Province. The population of Gorni Lom is 784.

The village is situated in a mountainous region, on the upper stream of the Lom River. It is located in the foot of Midzhur, the highest peak in western Stara Planina. Gorni Lom is a starting point for the tourists who climb Midzhur. Most of the village inhabitants work in a factory producing explosives or in the five small hydropower plants on the river.

Economy 
Significant part of the population is employed by the nearby Ammo Plant Videx (Former Midzhur Ammo Plant).

2014 explosions 
On 1 October 2014, in the former Midzhur Ammo Plant owned by Videx AD, a blast killed 15 workers and completely demolished the factory. The explosion happened at 16:59 local time, killing 15 men and two women and injuring three other women. According to authorities, an unspecified "human error" caused the explosion.

Following the incident, 3 October 2014 was declared a Day of National Mourning.

For more detailed information, see 2014 Gorni Lom explosions

See also 
 List of villages in Vidin Province

References

External links 
 Gorni Lom

Villages in Vidin Province